Nail Bomber: Manhunt is a 2021 Netflix Original true crime documentary film about the 1999 London nail bombings.

Production and distribution 
Nail Bomber: Manhunt was commissioned by Netflix from Expectation, a United Kingdom-based production company, in August 2020 under the title The Nailbomber. The film was directed by Daniel Vernon. Sonny Sheridan colour graded the film.

The film was released on Netflix on 26 May 2021.

Reception 
Brad Newsome of The Sydney Morning Herald called the film an "unusual and compelling documentary", noting the films focus on the people affected by the attack.

References

External links 

 
 
 
 

1999 in London
Netflix original documentary films
2020s English-language films